Jay La Suer (born January 24, 1940, in Hutchinson, Kansas, USA) is a Republican politician from the state of California, USA.

Education 
La Super is a graduate of FBI National Academy. La Suer earned a BA in Public Administration from San Diego State University.

Career 
La Suer was in his national Army during 1958–1961, the San Diego police department during 1961–1967.

In 1970, La Suer became an undersheriff with San Diego County Sheriff's Department until his retirement 1994.

La Suer was consultant for the Association of Builders and Contractors as Senior Director of Education. Prior to serving in the California State Legislature, LaSuer was elected Councilman and Mayor in La Mesa, serving during 1990–2000.

La Suer was first elected to the California State Assembly in 2000 and served until term limited out of office in 2006. He represented District 77, which includes the eastern San Diego County cities of El Cajon,
La Mesa, Santee, and eastern San Diego.

Personal life 
La Suer's wife is Lynn. They have two daughters. La Suer and his family live in LA Mesa, California.

References

External links
Jay La Suer political history

1940 births
Living people
Republican Party members of the California State Assembly
United States Army soldiers
People from La Mesa, California
Politicians from Hutchinson, Kansas
Mayors of places in California
21st-century American politicians
San Diego State University alumni